Metropolitan Park is a  urban waterfront park and concert venue located on the north bank of the St. Johns River in Downtown Jacksonville, Florida. It is projected to be the eastern terminus of the northbank Jacksonville Riverwalk.

Facility
The multi-purpose facility contains an exhibition mall for art, crafts and boat shows, a family picnic and playground area, and an earthen "bowl" with a performance pavilion which has a capacity of 10,000 persons and is home to many annual events, including The Jacksonville Jazz Festival, World of Nations Celebration, Spring Music Festival, Freedom, Fanfare & Fireworks on July 4, Planetfest and many more. The Jacksonville Symphony Orchestra occasionally performs there, as have many nationally known entertainers.

The primary facility is a  reversible stage with seating for 3,000 under the large canopy. There is a green room, production office and dressing rooms for performers. The park has full boat docking facilities with 78 boat slips.  
There are 6 covered picnic shelters and 43 picnic tables, 3 permanent restroom facilities and water fountains, a children's play area, grills, benches & bicycle racks, and security lighting for night use.

History
The park is located on what was once a landfill, purchased in May, 1972 for $1 million by the United States Department of Housing and Urban Development. 
The present park size is the result of several additions since the initial acquisition in 1972.

Development funding was provided by the City of Jacksonville, the State of Florida-Department of Natural Resources, and public broadcasting station WJCT (TV). The project was planned to be completed in two phases. The first phase included an exhibition mall, family picnic area, playgrounds, and the Performance Pavilion. Florida Governor Bob Graham attended the groundbreaking for the first phase, begun on December 8, 1982 by Mayor Jake Godbold. Work on Phase 1 was completed in 1984 at a cost of $1 million. Metropolitan Park was the winner of the 1986 Governor's Design Award.

Phase 2, which included paved walkways, lighting, landscaping, parking, and the entrance, cost another $1 million. Mayor Tommy Hazouri began the enhancements on May 10, 1990 and construction lasted several months.
The Catherine Street Fire Museum was moved to Metro Park property in 1993 but did not open to the public until 2001.

On November 15, 2008, 40 citizens from Jacksonville were joined by landscape architects and professional urban planners in a Charrette, a community visioning exercise for the future direction of Metropolitan Park. JaxPride, a nonprofit citizen coalition, sponsored the workshop, and the process was used previously on the Hemming Park to Hemming Plaza transition and several others. The director of the Jacksonville Economic Development Commission told the participants how his agency viewed the park and afterwards, Mayor John Peyton shared his thoughts:

I am not proud of the quality of this City-owned facility. What we currently have is a grade-A space with grade-D facilities. There's more chain-link fence in that park than anywhere in Jacksonville. People in Seattle would give their right arm to have a riverfront park. I'm going to do everything in my power in the next 31 months until I leave office to make Metropolitan Park a better place for all of us.

The City of Jacksonville contracted with consulting firm HDR, Inc. to submit a preliminary Metropolitan Park Improvement Project Master Plan to the City by the end of January, 2009. HDR staff collected hundreds of pages of suggestions, comments, sketches, drawings and ideas from the charrette to review and use in the plan.

Community leaders created the Metropolitan Park Kids Kampus Task Force in the 1990s to provide input for a new children's play area with physical, intellectual and social benefits. Educators were utilized to design structures and activities that allow children to be curious, explore and manipulate their physical environment.  
 
Construction began on Kids Kampus March 8, 2000, and the 10-acre facility, located beside Metro Park, opened March 6, 2001.
The park included a soccer field with bleachers, 10 Picnic shelters and individual picnic tables, grills, playground equipment, benches, bike racks, security lighting and a restroom. The largest attraction was a bicycle/tricycle driving range, modeled after downtown Jacksonville, including street signs, traffic signals and buildings.       
The seasonal water park at Kids Kampus featured "Three Friends", a boat-shaped structure with water cannons and a slide; and "Bayou, Bogs & Frogs" for children under six.

On May 5, 2010, JaxParks announced that the Splash Water Park at Kids Kampus would not open for 2010 due to impending demolition as part of Metropolitan Park renovations.
That announcement did not explicitly state that Kids Kampus would not return, but the Metro Jacksonville website noted that the Metropolitan Park Concept Plan included a small "Children's Discovery" area and the "Green" where the Kids Kampus was previously located. As of September 9, 2011, all traces of Kids Kampus had been removed and the area is now a grassy field.

A meeting was held in January, 2010 between Mayor Peyton and several city councilmen to discuss progress on three major downtown improvement projects, including redevelopment of Metropolitan Park. Legislation was filed to fund these three projects with a price tag of $23 million. $8.2 million was allocated to phase one of the Metropolitan Park redevelopment which included replacing the Kidz Kampus children's play area with better water features and access to the Fire Museum; removing fencing and other barriers to river access; and creating a 4-acre public lawn for a wide array of activities, and to include more picnic pavilions and shade trees. On February 9, 2010 the city council passed the three bills without debate, providing final approval for all three projects.

Gallery

References

External links
Official website

See also
Park page on city website
Metropolitan Park Concept Plan Development
Kids Kampus web page

Culture of Jacksonville, Florida
Parks in Jacksonville, Florida
Music venues in Florida
Geography of Jacksonville, Florida
Downtown Jacksonville
Sports Complex, Jacksonville
1984 establishments in Florida